Seitarō, Seitaro or Seitarou (written: 清太郎 or 誠太郎 ) is a masculine Japanese given name. Notable people with the name include:

, Japanese scientist
, Japanese speed skater
, Japanese anime director
, Japanese footballer

Japanese masculine given names